It's Punky Brewster is a 1985–1986 animated spin-off of the live action television sitcom Punky Brewster. It was animated by Ruby-Spears Productions. The show uses the same premise and main cast as its parent series, but also includes a magical sprite named Glomer. 26 episodes were produced over two seasons.

Synopsis 
The series featured the voices of the original Punky Brewster cast as their respective characters. A new character, Glomer (voiced by Frank Welker), was added as the "leprechaun gopher". He came from Chaundoon, a city at the end of the rainbow and possesses various magical powers. One such power was the ability to transport Punky and her friends, Margaux, Cherie, and Allen, and at times her dog, Brandon, to any part of the Earth instantly. Some episodes included Glomer having to correct his own mistakes, as when he plays around with magic and transforms Henry into a statue of Julius Caesar. It's Punky Brewster is the series' unofficial name (Punky when the show first premiered); on the title card and in TV listings, it was simply called Punky Brewster.

In season 2, shows 4 through 13 had a first-run episode and a repeat from the first season. The series was canceled in September 1987, but reruns returned from October 1988 until September 1989 after NBC's live action pre-teen show 2 Hip 4 TV was cancelled. The show was syndicated as a revolving feature of Maxie's World during the 1989–1990 season.

Cast 
 Soleil Moon Frye - Punky Brewster
 George Gaynes - Henry Warnimont
 Ami Foster - Margaux Kramer
 Cherie Johnson - Cherie Johnson
 Casey Ellison - Allen Anderson
 Frank Welker - Glomer, Brandon (barking; speaking voice in "Brandon the Dialogue Dog")

Additional voices 
 René Auberjonois
 Vince Edwards
 Pat Fraley
 Alejandro Garay
 Linda Gary
 Patty Glick
 Renae Jacobs
 Christina Lange
 Katie Leigh
 Joycelyne Lew
 Tress MacNeille
 Mea Martineau
 Janet Mays
 David Mendenhall
 Scott Menville - Chucky
 Lilly Moon
 Pat Musick
 Denise Pickering
 Hal Rayle
 Josh Rodine
 Neil Ross
 Shavar Ross

Susie Garrett, who played Betty, and T. K. Carter, who played Mike, are the only regular cast members of the sitcom that did not appear in the series.

Episodes

Season 1 (1985)

Season 2 (1986)

Home media 
The show was released on VHS in 1991, and several different tapes were made.

The series is available on DVD as part of the Punky Brewster DVD releases. Each season also contains a certain number of episodes from it as a bonus feature. Due to music rights issues, "The Shoe Must Go On" is the only episode not released on DVD in the season box sets released by Shout! Factory; a song featured in that episode was "Axel F" by Harold Faltermeyer, the theme to Beverly Hills Cop.

Popular culture 
The series was parodied in the Robot Chicken episode "But Not in That Way" (aired February 8, 2009) with Soleil Moon Frye reprising Punky Brewster, Henry Warnimont voiced by Seth Green, and Glomer voiced by Tom Kane.

Notes

References

External links 
 

1980s American animated television series
1985 American television series debuts
1986 American television series endings
American animated television spin-offs
American children's animated fantasy television series
Animated television series about orphans
English-language television shows
NBC original programming
Television series by Ruby-Spears
Television series by Universal Television
Television series by Sony Pictures Television
Animation based on real people